The 1969–70 County Championship was the 28th season of the Liga IV, the fourth tier of the Romanian football league system. The champions of each county association play against one from a neighboring county in a play-off  to gain promotion to Divizia C.

Promotion play-off

First phase 
The matches was played on 12, 19 and 22 July 1970.

Second phase 
The matches was played on 26, 29 July and 2 August 1970.

County leagues

Alba County

Arad County

Argeș County

Bacău County

Bihor County

Bistrița-Năsăud County

Botoșani County

Brașov County

Brăila County

Bucharest

Buzău County

Caraș-Severin County

Cluj County

Constanța County

Covasna County

Dâmbovița County

Galați County

Gorj County

Harghita County

Hunedoara County

Ialomița County

Iași County

Ilfov County

Maramureș County

Mehedinți County

Mureș County

Neamț County

Olt County

Prahova County

Satu Mare County

Sălaj County

Sibiu County

Suceava County

Teleorman County

Timiș County

Tulcea County

Vaslui County

Vâlcea County

Vrancea County

See also 

 1969–70 Divizia A
 1969–70 Divizia B
 1969–70 Divizia C

References

External links
 

Liga IV seasons
4
Romania